The men's high jump was a track & field athletics event at the 1900 Summer Olympics in Paris. It was held on July 15, 1900. Eight athletes from seven nations competed in the high jump. The event was won by Irving Baxter of the United States, the nation's second consecutive victory in the men's high jump. Great Britain (Patrick Leahy's silver) and Hungary (Lajos Gönczy's bronze) each took medals in their first appearance in the event.

Background

This was the second appearance of the event, which is one of 12 athletics events to have been held at every Summer Olympics. None of the jumpers from 1896 returned. Irving Baxter of the United States was the 1900 AAA champion, while Patrick Leahy of Great Britain had won in 1898 and 1899.

France, Great Britain, Hungary, and Norway each competed for the first time in the event. Germany, Sweden, and the United States all appeared for the second time.

Competition format

There was a single round of jumping. The bar started at 1.50 metres. When the victor was the only man left, he was able to choose the height.

Records

These were the standing world and Olympic records (in metres) prior to the 1900 Summer Olympics.

(*) unofficial

Irving Baxter improved the Olympic record twice. At first he jumped 1.85 metres and finally he also cleared 1.90 metres.

Schedule

The Sunday schedule prevented two Americans, William Remington and Walter Carroll, from competing.

Results

Baxter won easily, clearing 1.85 metres and 1.90 metres. With no one else close, he attempted to break the world record, 1.97 metres at the time. He failed all three times he attempted it, but still took the gold medal. Jump sequences are known only for Baxter's jumps at 1.85 metres and above.

References

Sources
 International Olympic Committee.
 De Wael, Herman. Herman's Full Olympians: "Athletics 1900". Accessed 18 March 2006.
 

Men's jumping high
High jump at the Olympics